Khertvisi is a village in Aspindza Municipality of Samtskhe-Javakheti region, the Republic of Georgia. Situated at the confluence of rivers Mtkvari and Paravani, the village was set on a number of terraces.

According to the chronicles, in ancient times Khertvisi was a town. The last mention was in the second half of 18th century. The large Khertvisi Fortress was built here presumably in the 10th-11th centuries. In 1771, when the fortress was temporarily taken back from Turks by the King Erekle II, a large amount of valuables and goods was evacuated. This hinted historians that Khertvisi was indeed a town.

References

Populated places in Samtskhe–Javakheti